Donuca orbigera is a species of moth of the family Noctuidae first described by Achille Guenée in 1852. It is found in the northern half of Australia.

The wingspan is about 50 mm.

References

Catocalina